State Highway 7 (abbreviated SH-7) is a  highway in southern Oklahoma. This lengthy highway connects many towns in Oklahoma's "Little Dixie" area. It runs from Interstate 44 in Lawton to U.S. 69/US-75 in Atoka.

Route description
From its western terminus at the interchange with Interstate 44 and Lee Boulevard in Lawton, SH-7 is a multilane highway. It runs due east from Lawton for  before intersecting State Highway 65 in the unincorporated community of Pumpkin Center. It continues due east for 14 more miles on a straight stretch of highway only very slight curves, bypassing the town of Central High, before meeting US-81 north of Duncan.

SH-7 and US-81 overlap for  through Duncan, after which the state highway splits off to the east once again, still as a multilane highway, though it falls to a two-lane road after a few miles. Next the highway passes through the town of Velma before meeting State Highway 76 in Ratliff City. The southern section of SH-74, which roughly mirrors SH-76's path, has its southern terminus at SH-7 seven miles (11 km) later, near Tatums.

After crossing Interstate 35, SH-7 becomes a multilane highway once again. Three miles later, it meets US-77 near Davis. On the other side of Davis, SH-7 is the northern terminus of SH-110, a connector route to the town of Dougherty. Two miles west of Sulphur, the highway connects to the southern terminus of SH-7 Spur which connects to the Chickasaw Turnpike, a toll highway to Ada. After passing through Sulphur (where it has a brief concurrency with US-177), SH-7 travels six more miles, where it meets Highway 1.

For , SH-7 and SH-1 overlap, through the town of Mill Creek. It shares a one-mile (1.6 km) three-route concurrency with US-377/SH-99. Thirteen miles east of the concurrency, it serves the town of Wapanucka, Oklahoma, where it intersects SH-48. Seventeen miles later, it ends at US-75 in Atoka.

History
SH-7 is a former border to border east–west state highway across southern Oklahoma whose western terminus was at the Texas border west of Hollis and eastern terminus at the Arkansas border east of Broken Bow. SH-7's route was truncated on its eastern and western sections during the 1960s and 1970s as those were concurrent with US-62 between the Texas border and Lawton and with US-70 between Broken Bow and the Arkansas border. The eastern portion of SH-7 that was concurrent with US-70 between Broken Bow and the Arkansas border was truncated in 1963 to its junction with US-70 in Broken Bow. The western section of SH-7 concurrent with US-62 from Lawton to the Texas border was truncated in 1970, when the highway's western terminus was pushed back to the intersection of Cache Road (US-62) and Sheridan Road in Lawton, and a few miles further back in 2003 to its current terminus at Interstate 44 in east Lawton.

Along still-intact sections of SH-7, major route changes through the years include a relocation in Duncan during the early 1950s, when the original route along Main Street through the downtown area was moved south of the business district along Bois D'Arc Avenue from US-81 eastward to tie in with the original Main Street route on Duncan's east side, which became SH-7 Alternate and now designated as SH-7 Business. In the 1980s, the new SH-7 was extended east of Velma past the small community of County Line on the Stephens–Carter county line to west of Ratliff City in Carter County.

By 1985, the eastern terminus of SH-7 was pushed back to its intersection with SH-3 and US-69/75 in Atoka when SH-7 was again truncated and lost its concurrency with SH-3 from Atoka to Broken Bow.

Spurs
SH-7 has three spur routes. Two of these routes bear the number "7" with a letter suffix; the third is a special route.

SH-7B

SH-7B, also signed as Business SH-7, is the original alignment of SH-7 through Duncan.

SH-7D

SH-7D is a  spur to the town of Bromide.

SH-7 Spur

SH-7 Spur is a  spur in Murray County. It begins at SH-7 west of Sulphur, heading northeast, to end at a diamond interchange with US-177. The road continues east as the Chickasaw Turnpike.

SH-7 Spur was built by the Oklahoma Turnpike Authority (OTA) as the westernmost segment of the Chickasaw Turnpike, which opened on September 1, 1991. It was transferred from OTA to ODOT on August 1, 2011, receiving the SH-7 Spur designation and becoming a free road. It was the first segment of turnpike in Oklahoma to be transferred to ODOT. Transferring the turnpike was considered an inexpensive way to solve the problem of excessive truck traffic in Sulphur. At the time of the transfer, the interchange at the eastern terminus only allowed access from the westbound turnpike to US-177, and from US-177 to the eastbound turnpike. ODOT had expanded the interchange to a full interchange by 2013.

Junction list

References

External links
SH-7 at OKHighways

007
Lawton, Oklahoma
Transportation in Comanche County, Oklahoma
Transportation in Stephens County, Oklahoma
Transportation in Carter County, Oklahoma
Transportation in Murray County, Oklahoma
Transportation in Johnston County, Oklahoma
Transportation in Atoka County, Oklahoma